Kim Joon-Beom (born 23 June 1986) is a South Korean footballer who plays as a midfielder for Gangneung City on loan from Gangwon FC in the K-League.

External links 

1986 births
Living people
Association football midfielders
South Korean footballers
Gangneung City FC players
Gangwon FC players
Korea National League players
K League 1 players